, the art of gunnery, is the martial art of Japan dedicated to firearms usage.

Hōjutsu is still practiced today, often with antique matchlock firearms such as the tanegashima. The martial art is most common in Japan where access to historical equipment is easier for practitioners. Groups such as the Matsumoto Castle Gun Corps  maintain large collections of Edo era firearms.

Schools
 Inatomi-ryū
 Geki-ryū
 Ogino-ryū
 Tanegashima-ryū
 Tatsuke-ryū
 Seki-ryū
 Bue-ryū
 Morishige-ryū
 Yō-ryū
 Takashima-ryū

Gun groups
Gun groups were known as teppo tai (鉄砲隊). Teppo meaning "gun" and tai meaning "group", or "unit".

Recently the general media has come to view the samurai as warriors who were armed only with close combat weapons such as the katana. However, the Japanese were arguably using guns more effectively than their European counterparts by the sixteenth century, as well as producing more accurate, durable varieties.

The Battle of Nagashino, where guns were deployed against samurai cavalry, is one of the most famous and influential battles in the history of the samurai.

Ashigaru

The ashigaru were the lowest class of soldier in feudal Japan and were formed as militia units during times of conflict. The arrival of guns in Japan in 1543 greatly increased the capability of the ashigaru units on the battlefield. Prior to the introduction of firearms, these men would often have to wield polearms and spears like yari or learn to fight with swords and bows. The matchlock, or tanegashima by comparison was easier to use. It did not rely on physical strength or regular practice to be effective. In addition the firearms could be stockpiled in great numbers when not required. As such, samurai and professional soldiers would train the lower classes in hōjutsu.

See also
Gun kata

External links
Matsumoto Castle Gun Corps

Japanese martial arts